Henri Linssen (Roermond, 28 October 1805 – Roermond, 8 April 1869) was a Dutch painter.

Biography
Henri Linssen was born in Roermond, Limburg, on 28 October 1805. He was active in Antwerp from 1824 to 1828. In 1830 he moved to Paris, where he studied, and was active until 1843. Between 1834 and 1840 he exhibited at the Salon. In 1843 he returned to Roermond and was named director of the Stastekenschool. He retired in 1861. Linssen died in Roermond on 8 April 1869.

Works (selection)

References

External links

1805 births
1869 deaths
Dutch male painters
People from Roermond